Kurashvili is a Georgian surname. Notable people with the surname include:

Gujar Kurashvili (born 1951), Georgian general
Mamuka Kurashvili (born 1970), Georgian general
Tsira Kurashvili (born 1962), Georgian writer, poet, children's author, and philologist

Georgian-language surnames